Anjur is a village in the Thane region, Maharashtra state.

References

Villages in Thane district